Taylor Ryan Cornall (born 9 October 1998) is an English cricketer. He made his first-class debut on 26 March 2019, for Leeds/Bradford MCCU against Derbyshire, as part of the Marylebone Cricket Club University fixtures. He has also played for the Lancashire 2nd XI team. He made his List A debut on 5 August 2021, for Lancashire in the 2021 Royal London One-Day Cup.

References

External links
 

1998 births
Living people
English cricketers
Lancashire cricketers
Worcestershire cricketers
Leeds/Bradford MCCU cricketers
English cricketers of the 21st century
People from Lytham St Annes